The Rev Thomas "Tom" Henry Hollingdale AKC (12 November 1900 – 14 April 1978), was a Church of England cleric and Wales international rugby player.

Rugby career
Thomas Hollingdale was born in Waunarlwydd on 12 November 1900. He attended Waunarlwydd School and Gowerton County School. He played his club rugby for Ammanford and Neath and captained Glamorganshire. In September 1927, he played for a combined Aberavon and Neath XV against the touring New South Wales Waratahs and a few weeks later, played for Wales against the Waratahs – this is now treated as a full international. He was capped in total six times for Wales in the late 1920s. On 26 November 1930 he played for a Welsh International XV against Reading, but never again represented his country.

International matches played
 1927
 1928
 1928
 1928
 1928, 1930

Subsequent career
Hollingdale was employed in the local steel works and later as a policeman (PC number 22 on the Neath Police Force), before studying theology at King's College London, where he became an Associate of King's College (AKC). Following his ordination, he worked as a curate in Upminster and subsequently as vicar of the parish of Stratford in East London. From 1948 to 1959 he was vicar of St Peter's, Colchester — a living controlled by the Simeon Trust. During this time he contributed articles to rugby magazines and other publications and was President of Colchester RFC. Thereafter, he became rector of the parish of Copford, Essex until he retired in 1968.

He married Leah Williams in April 1921 at Swansea and they had three daughters – Joan, Mercia and Muriel (who was known by her second name, Shirley).

He died on 14 April 1978 in Hounslow.

References

Welsh rugby union players
Wales international rugby union players
Rugby union number eights
Church of England priests
20th-century Welsh Anglican priests
20th-century Church of England clergy
Alumni of King's College London
1900 births
1978 deaths
Associates of King's College London
Neath RFC players
Glamorgan County RFC players
Ammanford RFC players
Rugby union players from Swansea